The following is a summary of Donegal county football team's 2018 season.

Personnel changes
Declan Bonner began his second spell in charge of the team. John McElholm was appointed team trainer and Gary Boyle coach. Paul Fisher led the strength and conditioning team, Ronan Doherty joined as nutritionist and Cathal Ellis was there as physiotherapist, psychologist Anthony McGrath and video analyst Chris Byrne. Karl Lacey also became part of the coaching team ahead of the 2018 season.

Nathan Mullins, son of former Dublin player Brian, played for Donegal during the 2018 season.

Kevin McBrearty, who had first been called up ahead of the 2015 Dr McKenna Cup, played in the 2018 National Football League.

Goalkeeper Shaun Patton came into the team versus Kildare in the National Football League. He began training in January 2018. Peter Boyle quit in a dispute over Patton replacing him in the team. Mark Anthony McGinley, the other goalkeeper, also quit the county panel — and the sport entirely.

Eoin McHugh was not involved for the 2018 season, electing to go to Boston instead. Michael Carroll also left the panel.

Jason McGee and Niall O'Donnell both missed the 2018 championship after deciding to play for the under-20 team instead.

Karl Lacey retired at the end of the previous season.

Leo McLoone returned after voluntarily departing the previous year. Likewise Odhrán Mac Niallais. And Anthony Thompson.

Competitions

Dr McKenna Cup

Donegal won the McKenna Cup in 2018.

National Football League Division 1

Fixtures for the 2018 National League were announced on 13 October 2017.

Table

Reports

Ulster Senior Football Championship

The draw for the 2018 Ulster Senior Football Championship took place on 19 October 2017.
Donegal won their first Ulster title for four years.

Bracket

Reports

All-Ireland Senior Football Championship

All-Ireland Quarter-Finals Group 2 table

Reports

Management team
Confirmed in November 2017:
Manager: Declan Bonner
Assistant manager: Paul McGonigle, not listed among November 2017 appointments
Head coach: John McElholm
Coach: Gary Boyle
Selector: Karl Lacey until end of 2018 season but Lacey actually carried on until the end of 2020
Goalkeeping coach: Andrew McGovern
Strength and conditioning coach: Paul Fisher
Nutritionist: Ronan Doherty
Team physician: Kevin Moran
Physio: Cathal Ellis
Psychology and performance manager: Anthony McGrath, previously involved with the minor team
Video analysis: Chris Byrne
Logistics: Packie McDyre
Kitman: Barry McBride

Awards

All Stars
Ryan McHugh won an All Star. Eoghan Bán Gallagher and Michael Murphy were also nominated.

County breakdown
 Dublin = 7
 Monaghan = 3
 Tyrone = 2
 Kerry = 1
 Donegal = 1
 Galway = 1

The Sunday Game Team of the Year
The Sunday Game selected Eoghan Bán Gallagher at left corner-back on its Team of the Year.

Player of the Year
Eoghan Bán Gallagher

Donegal News Sports Personality of the Month
Eoghan Bán Gallagher: June

GAA.ie Football Team of the Week

 26 February: Ryan McHugh, Patrick McBrearty

References

Donegal
Donegal county football team seasons